Stanley Jayasinghe (born January 19, 1931 in Badulla) is a former Sri Lankan cricketer who played for Ceylon prior to the country being renamed Sri Lanka, and prior to them receiving either Test of ODI status. He was a right-handed batsman and part-time offbreak bowler. In his first-class cricket career which began in 1949/50 he also played cricket in England for Leicestershire.  In 1965 he publicly refused to play against the white-only South Africans who were touring England, after his own experiences of racism playing against the South Africans in 1960. He retired in 1968/69.

In September 2018, he was one of 49 former Sri Lankan cricketers felicitated by Sri Lanka Cricket, to honour them for their services before Sri Lanka became a full member of the International Cricket Council (ICC).

Early life
Stanley who was educated at Nalanda College, Colombo captained Nalanda College first XI cricket team in 1951. Some of Stanley's notable classmates at Nalanda College were Karunaratne Abeysekera, Dr Harischandra Wijayatunga, Dr Hudson Silva, Hon. Dr Dharmasena Attygalle, Dr Henry Jayasena, Hon. Rupa Karunathilake,  Bernie Wijesekera.

Former All Ceylon and Nondescripts Cricket Club cricketer Carl Obeysekera and Ashley de Silva who were also from Nalanda College played for Ceylon at the same time.

Stanley was adjudged the Times of Ceylon Sportsman of the Year in 1951.

Cricket administrator
Stanley Jayasinghe also has been one time a member of the National Selection Committee and Manager of Sri Lanka cricket team.
Stanley was a hugely sought-after coach in Sri Lanka from the late 1970's, after he migrated to Sri Lanka.  He had gained fame playing brilliantly for Lestersihre before moving back to his home country. His coaching style, coupled with a caring, fatherly-treatment towards his students, made him one of the most successful coaches in the country during the 70's and 80's. He later was appointed the Manager of the Sri Lankan cricket team and developed it to very high standards, laying the discipline and attitude in the players he managed, who later led the Sri Lankan team to its one and only ODI World Cup in 1996.

Family life
Stanley is married to Erika, a German and they are blessed with a daughter, Yvonne.

References

 Brown, Geoff and Hogsbjerg, Christian. Apartheid is not a Game: Remembering the Stop the Seventy Tour campaign. London: Redwords, 2020. .
 

 

 

 

 

 Sri Lanka, game changers since 1964

1931 births
Living people
All-Ceylon cricketers
Commonwealth XI cricketers
Sri Lankan cricketers
Leicestershire cricketers
Sri Lankan Buddhists
Alumni of Nalanda College, Colombo
People from Badulla
A. E. R. Gilligan's XI cricketers